Echo Lake was perhaps the most notable multimedia software product produced by Delrina, which debuted in February 1995. It was touted internally as a "cross [of] Quark Xpress and Myst". It featured an immersive 3D environment where a user could go to a virtual desktop in a virtual office and assemble video and audio clips along with images, and then print them out as either a virtual book other users of the program could use, or for print. It was a highly innovative product for its time, and ultimately was hampered by the inability of many users able to input their own multimedia content easily into a computer from that period.

Creative Wonders bought the rights to the Echo Lake multimedia product, which was re-shaped as an introductory program on multimedia and re-released as Family Album Creator.

References

External links
My Echo Lake Scrapbook 

Graphics software